Leptopilina is a genus of parasitoid wasp in the family Figitidae. The genus is best known for the three Drosophila parasitoids Leptopilina boulardi, Leptopilina heterotoma and Leptopilina clavipes, used to study host-parasite immune interactions. The venom released by L. heterotoma during oviposition contains virus-like particles that delay host larval development and suppress the host cellular immune response. There is no evidence that these virus-like particles are the products of viral DNA as described in other parasitoid taxa.

L. japonica is a parasitoid of Drosophila suzukii which is an important pest in fruit production. First captured in November 2020 as bycatch from a Vespa mandarinia trap in Washington State - the first find of this species in the United States. This may help to control D. suzukii in North America.

References 

Hymenoptera genera